The Ogle SX1000 is a front-wheel drive Mini-based coupé-style motor vehicle designed by David Ogle, the founder of Ogle Design. The car was introduced to the public in December 1961, and from the following year David Ogle Ltd. offered to transform any customer's Mini into an SX1000 for £550 All of the car's mechanical components came from the Mini, but with a new fibreglass body shell. The windscreen comes from the Riley 1.5, as does the indicator stalk on the right of the steering column. The SX1000 has the same front disc and rear drum brake arrangement as the standard Mini Cooper.

A racing version of the SX1000 was produced later in 1962, the Ogle Lightweight GT. As well as its lighter body it had a built-in rollbar, lowered suspension, and bucket seats.

An Ogle SX1000 can be seen in the Beatles movie "A Hard Days Night".

Engine and performance
BMC, the manufacturer of the Mini on which the SX1000 is based, initially refused to supply new parts to David Ogle Ltd, but eventually relented on condition that the word Mini was not mentioned in any promotional material. All Ogle cars were subsequently supplied with new Mini Cooper  engines, and priced at £1,190.

Their complimentary test report stated that the car was able to exceed . While Motorsport magazine's reviewer was impressed by the car, and in particular by the high quality of its glassfibre body, the report's overall conclusion was that "Economically it is difficult to justify the purchase of a car like this which is heavier than the standard car from which it is derived and has fewer seats".

End of production
In May 1962 David Ogle was killed in a road traffic accident when he crashed into a lorry while driving an Ogle Lightweight GT to the Brands Hatch racing circuit. The company decided to cease production of the SX1000 following Ogle's death. The last cars were completed towards the end of 1963, by which time 69 had been built.

Later developments
The moulds for the SX1000 were sold to Norman Fletcher of Fletcher Marine in 1966, and the following year saw its reappearance as the Fletcher GT. As of 2018 Nostalgia Cars UK are offering a replica version of the SX1000, their NC Coupe, also known as the SX1275.

References

Notes

Citations

Bibliography

External links
Virtual tour of the Ogle SX1000

Cars introduced in 1961
Front-wheel-drive sports cars
Cars of England